Dietmar Feichtinger (born 18 November 1961 in Bruck an der Mur) is an Austrian architect established since 1989 in Paris.

Biography
After graduating in 1988 from the Technical University of Graz with honors, he moved to Paris in 1989 where he founded the studio Dietmar Feichtinger Architectes in 1994. Today, the firm has 35 employees. A wide range of buildings have been built by the company in Europe including schools, pools, office buildings and housing. 

Overall the firm has built a strong reputation for its inventive structures and its investigative approach in designing bridges. 

In 1998 he won the competition for the Passerelle Simone-de-Beauvoir over the Seine, facing the Bibliothèque Nationale de France. Inaugurated by Bertrand Delanoë on 13 July 2006, the bridge has a total length of 304 meters and a clear span of 190 meters and is the first of the 37 Parisian bridges to carry the name of a female personality.

In 2002 Feichtinger won the competition for the new access bridge to Mont Saint-Michel, a monument classified world heritage by UNESCO, with a total length of 1841 meters. The bridge opened to pedestrians in July 2014 and shuttles in December 2014. During high tides the Mount becomes an island again thanks to the global restoring operation  of its maritime character that began in 1995 and is provided by the Syndicat Mixte Baie du Mont-Saint Michel.
In 2014, Dietmar Feichtinger was elected permanent member of the Academy of Arts Berlin.
Even though he claims not to be a 'bridge specialist', he is the architect of 13 bridges and footbridges built in Europe including the Three Country Bridge between France and Germany over the Rhine and the Passerelle de la Paix in Lyon that opened to the public in March 2014.

Currently, the studio works on the Centre for Research in Neuroscience on the Saclay Nuclear Research Centre campus as part of the Paris-Saclay operation, one of the main projects of the Grand Paris, development project for the whole of the Paris metropolitan area. One of Dietmar Feichtinger's recent works is the walkway Aldilonda on the coastline of Bastia, Corsica.

Awards

 2020 EUMiesAward - Fundació Mies van der Rohe, nomination of School Center Gloggnitz, Austria
 2019 Prix de la conception lumière extérieure et paysager 2019, French Light Design Award for the Eiffeltower Project with Agence ON 
 2017 Ingenieurbaupreis des Deutschen Stahlbaus, Engineering Award of German Steel Construction, Passerelle de la Paix, Lyon, France
 2015 Mies-van-der-Rohe-Award 2015, Nomination of the Jetty to Mont Saint-Michel
 2015 Equerre d'Argent, French Architecture Award, winner category 'Bridges' with the Jetty to Mont Saint-Michel
 2015 French Wood Construction Award, the Jetty to Mont Saint-Michel
 2014 Nominated permanent member of the Academy of Arts Berlin
 2012 Equerre d'Argent, French Architecture Award, special mention School Center Lucie Aubrac, Nanterre, France
 2011 Mies-van-der-Rohe Award 2011, nomination of 2 projects : Administration building voestalpine Linz and County Hospital, Klagenfurt, Austria
 2011 ZV Bauherrenpreis, Austria, 2011, County hospital, Klagenfurt, Austria
 2011 Ernst Plischke Preis 2011, awarded, Bilger-Breustedt Schoolgroup, Taufkirchen, Austria
 2011 EU Green Building Certification, Department hospital, Klagenfurt, Austria
 2011 Footbridge Award, Category Téchnique, Footbridge Valmy, La Défense – Paris, France
 2010 Best Office Award, Category International, Administration building voestalpine Linz, Austria
 2010 Plus Beaux Ouvrages de construction Métallique, Footbridges Braque, Miro et Chagall in Strasbourg, France
 2010 Prix DETAIL, nomination, Cooperate Identity, Administration building voestalpine Linz, Austria	
 2009 Wood Award, Land of Upper Austria, Bilger-Breustedt School group, Taufkirchen, Austria
 2009 ZV Bauherrenpreis, Austria 2009, Bilger-Breustedt School group, Taufkirchen, Austria
 2009 DETAIL Award, Innovation Stahl, Passerelle Simone-de-Beauvoir, Paris, France
 2008 German Bridge and Footbridge Award, Footbridge over the Rhine
 2008 Footbridge Award, Passerelle Simone de Beauvoir category aesthetics; Three Country Bridge, technical category
 2008 Hayden Medal, USA, Three Country Bridge
 2008 ECCS Award
 2008 German Award for steel construction, Three Country Bridge
 2007 Mies van der Rohe Award, nomination of 3 projects of the office
 2007 European Steel Design Award, Simone de Beauvoir footbridge
 2007 ZV Bauherrenpreis, Austria, University Camus Krems, Austria
 2007 Renault Future Traffic Award, Footbridge over the Rhine
 2007 Building of the year Museum footbridge
 2007 Architecture Award of the Land of Styria, Geramb-Rose, Cultural Center Weiz
 2006 Equerre d'argent, French architecture award for the Simone de Beauvoir Bridge, Paris
 2006 Architecture Award of the Land of Lower Austria
 2006 Award for the best building 2006, Shanghai Bridge Hamburg, Germany
 2005 Nomination Equerre d'argent, French architecture award
 1998 Kunstpreis Berlin, career promotion award for architecture made by the Akademie der Künste (Academy of Arts)

Selection of completed projects

 Aldilonda Promenade over the sea, Citadelle of Bastia  Corsica, Belgium, completed 2020
 Extension of the Ostend train station, Belgium, completed 2019
 Security and Transparency: Fencing the Eiffel Tower, Paris, France, completed 2018
 Headquarter Veolia Environment, Paris, France, completed 2016
 Headquarter Lille Métropole Habitat, Tourcoing, France, completed 2015
 Sportcenter Jules Ladoumègue, Paris, France, completed 2014
 Peace footbridge over the Rhone, Lyon, France, completed 2014
 Sport Center Hector Berlioz, Vincennes, France, completed 2013
 University of Provence, Aix-en-Provence, France, completed 2013
 School group Albert Camus, Coulaines, France, completed 2013
 School group Lucie Aubrac, Nanterre, France, completed 2012 
 New City Center, commercial center, kindergarten and multiplex cinema, Montreuil-sous-Bois, France, completed 2012 
 Footbridge Oude Dokken, Ghent, Belgium, completed 2012
 77 housing units Eurgoate, 0 Energy, Vienne, Austria, completed 2012 
 70 housing units and kindergarten Lehen, Salzburg, Austria, completed 2012 
 93 housing units and retail space, Paris, France, completed 2012 
 Moveable and fix footbridge, Willebroek, Belgium, completed 2012
 County Hospital of Carinthy, Klagenfurt, Austria, completed 2009 
 Office Voestalpine, Linz, Austria, completed 2009
 Bilger-Breustedt School Group, Taufkirchen, Austria, completed 2009
 Three Footbridges – BRAQUE, CHAGALL, MIRO, Strasbourg, France, completed 2008
 Footbridge Valmy, Paris, La Défense, France, completed 2007
 Museum Footbridge, Hamburg, Germany, completed 2007
 Footbridge Simone de Beauvoir, Paris, France, completed 2006
 Shanghai Bridge, Hamburg, Germany, completed 2006
 Three-country Footbridge, Weil-am-Rhein, Germany | Huningue, France, completed 2006
 University Campus, Krems, Austria, completed 2005
 Cultural Center, Weiz, Austria, completed 2005
 Logistic center A1, Gennevilliers, France, completed 2005

Bibliography
Feichtinger Architectes "Passerelle Simone-de-Beauvoir Paris", AAM Editions, Brüssel 2007,

External links

 Official web site of Dietmar Feichtinger Architectes
  Mont Saint Michel sea project
 Footbridge Simone-de-Beauvoir on City of Paris web site
 Dreiländerbrücke or Tri country bridge

Austrian architects
1961 births
Members of the Academy of Arts, Berlin
Living people